The 1977–78 CHL season was the 15th season of the Central Hockey League, a North American minor professional league. Six teams participated in the regular season, and the Fort Worth Texans won the league title.

Regular season

Playoffs

External links 
 Statistics on hockeydb.com

CPHL
Central Professional Hockey League seasons